Aliabad is a settlement and municipality in Nakhchivan City, Nakhchivan AR, Azerbaijan. It is located in the near of the Nakhchivan-Sharur highway, on the plain. Its population is busy with grain-growing, vegetable-growing and animal husbandry. There are secondary school, music school, library, club, kindergarten and a medical center in the settlement. In the center of the settlement was built the memorial complex of "Martyrs". It has a population of 9,495.

Etymology
In Soviet times, it was called in the name of Armenian bolshevik Alexander Miasnikian. Since 1991, it is officially registered as Aliabad. The name of the settlement means "the settlement which belongs to Ali".

Monuments 
There was an Armenian church (St. Astvatsatsin Church) located in the central part of the settlement. The church was destroyed at some point between 1997 and 2005.

See also 
St. Astvatsatsin Church (Aliabad)

References 

Populated places in Azerbaijan
Nakhchivan (city)